Samuel Blaser (born 20 July 1981 in La Chaux-de-Fonds, Switzerland) is a Swiss trombonist and composer.

Biography 
Born and raised in La Chaux-de-Fonds, Switzerland, Samuel Blaser lived in New York City for many years before relocating to Berlin, where he currently resides. He began trombone lessons at the age of 9, and his early interests ranged from Swiss folk music to American R&B and jazz. He entered the local conservatory at 14 and graduated in 2002 after being awarded prizes in both the jazz and classical spheres, including the 2000 Benny Golson Prize. Participation in the heralded Vienna Art Orchestra and European Radio Big Band eventually led to a Fulbright Scholarship, facilitating studies in the United States at the Purchase College Conservatory of Music where he studied with James E. Pugh and John Fedchock.

In his relatively short career, Blaser has worked with Swiss percussion legend Pierre Favre, guitarist Marc Ducret, saxophonist Oliver Lake, trumpet player Wallace Roney and drummer John Hollenbeck, and has worked with Grammy Award-winning producer Robert Sadin, and more recently with drummer Daniel Humair and clarinetist Michel Portal.

In 2019 the French Jazz Academy presented Samuel Blaser with the coveted European Musician Award, recognizing the importance of his work in the field of jazz. The same year Blaser was voted #2 Rising Star Trombone of the 2019 Downbeat Critics Poll.

Projects 
Beyond Blaser's ability to combine knotty compositional form with incendiary improvisational prowess in the context of his own music, his unfettered yet ever-collaborative approach has resulted in a number of significant associations, among them his ongoing work with Swiss percussion legend Pierre Favre; a much-lauded duo with guitarist Marc Ducret; a trio with Swiss drummer Daniel Humair and bassist Heiri Känzig as well as a Quartet with Russ Lossing, Masa Kamaguchi and Gerry Hemingway. In the genre of jazz, Blaser appears on 80 recordings between 2000 and 2020.

Discography 
 7th Heaven (Between the Lines, 2008), with Scott DuBois, Thomas Morgan, Gerald Cleaver
 YAY (Fresh Sound, 2009), with Malcolm Braff
 Solo Bone (Slam Productions, 2009)
 Pieces of Old Sky (Clean Feed, 2009), with Thomas Morgan, Todd Neufeld
 Vol à Voile (Intakt, 2010) with Pierre Favre
 Boundless (Hathut, 2011), with Marc Ducret, Bänz Oester, Gerald Cleaver
 Consort in Motion (Kind of Blue, 2011), with Paul Motian, Russ Lossing, Thomas Morgan
 One from None (Fresh Sound, 2012), with Michael Bates, Michael Blake, Russ Lossing, Jeff Davis
 As The Sea (HatHut, 2012), with Marc Ducret, Bänz Oester, Gerald Cleaver
 A Mirror to Machaut (Songlines, 2013) with Joachim Badenhorst, Russ Lossing, Drew Gress, Gerry Hemingway 
 Fourth Landscape (Nuscope, 2014) with Benoît Delbecq, Gerry Hemingway
 Spring Rain (Whirlwind, 2015), with Russ Lossing, Drew Gress, Gerald Cleaver
 Oostum (NoBusiness, 2018), with Gerry Hemingway
 Taktlos Zürich 2017 (Hathut, 2018), with Marc Ducret, Peter Bruun
 Early in the Mornin''' (Outnote, 2018), with Russ Lossing, Masa Kamaguchi, Gerry Hemingway, Oliver Lake, Wallace Roney
 The Great Tommy McCook (Blaser Music, 2020), with Soweto Kinch, Michael Blake, Alex Wilson, Alan Weekes, Ira Coleman and Dion Parson
 Audio Rebel (Blaser Music, 2020), with Marc Ducret
 ABC vol. 1 (Blaser Music, 2020), with Marc Ducret and Peter Bruun
 ABC vol. 2 (Blaser Music, 2020), with Marc Ducret and Peter Bruun
 1291 (Outnote, 2020), with Daniel Humair, Heiri Känzig
 18 monologues élastiques (Outnote, 2020)
 Live at Cornelia Street Café (Blaser Music, 2020), with Paul Motian, Eivind Opsvik and Russ Lossing
 Moods (Blaser Music, 2020), with Marc Ducret, Masa Kamaguchi and Gerry Hemingway
 Voyageurs'' (Jazzdor Series, 2021), with Marc Ducret

Awards and honors 
 European Musician Award, French Jazz Academy, 2019
 Downbeat Critics Poll, USA, Rising star trombonist, #4 in 2016, #4 in 2015, #7 in 2013
 New York City Jazz Record, USA, Musician of the Year, 2014
 Jazzparade, Switzerland, “Prix du public” et “coup de Coeur du Jury” awarded by Bob Mintzer, 2006
 Jay Jay Johnson Prize, USA, Honorable mention, 2006
 Fulbright Grant, USA, One-year Study Grant, 2005
 Robert Faller Prize, Switzerland, 2002
 Benny Golson Prize, Switzerland, 2000

References

External links
 Official website

Swiss jazz composers
1981 births
Living people
People from La Chaux-de-Fonds
21st-century Swiss musicians
Swiss jazz trombonists
21st-century trombonists
Fresh Sounds Records artists
Clean Feed Records artists
NoBusiness Records artists
Whirlwind Recordings artists